Pio Fedi (1815–1892) was an Italian sculptor who worked chiefly in the Romantic style.

Works
Fedi is best known for his sculpture of the Rape of Polyxena, or Pyrrhus and Polyxena (unveiled 1866), in the Loggia dei Lanzi in Florence, Italy. Fedi had a studio at 89 Via de Serragli. He also completed two of the statues of illustrious Tuscans, Niccola Pisano and Andrea Cesalpino, for the Loggiato degli Uffizi which is adjacent to the Loggia dei Lanzi. His other works included a sculptural group of the Fury of Atamante, King of Thebes, The Genius of Fishing, Hope Nourishing Love, Hyppolite and Dianora del Bardi, and Castalla persecuted by Apollon. He designed the Monument to General Manfredo Fanti, molded in bronze by Papi, which stands in the Piazza San Marco.

Fedi's Memorial to Niccolini is found in the church of Santa Croce, Florence. The statue, depicting an allegory of Freedom of Poetry may have inspired Bartholdi's depiction of the Statue of Liberty.

One of his pupils was Giovanni Bastianini.

Gallery

Notes

References
 Emilio Bacciotti, Bacciotti's Handbook of Florence and Its Environs, Or, The Stranger Conducted Through Its Principal Monuments, Studios, Churches, Palaces, Galleries, Streets and Shops, Tipografia Mariani, 1885.

External links

1816 births
1892 deaths
19th-century Italian sculptors
Italian male sculptors
19th-century Italian male artists